Rowlandius is a genus of hubbardiid short-tailed whipscorpions, first described by Reddell & Cokendolpher in 1995.

Species 
, the World Schizomida Catalog accepts the following sixty-two species:

 Rowlandius abeli Armas, 2002 – Cuba
 Rowlandius alayoni (Armas, 1989) – Cuba
 Rowlandius anasilviae (Armas & Abud Antun, 1990) – Dominican Republic
 Rowlandius arduus Armas, Villarreal & Colmenares-García, 2009 – Venezuela
 Rowlandius arenicola Teruel, Armas & Rodríguez, 2012 – Cuba
 Rowlandius baracoae (Armas, 1989) – Cuba
 Rowlandius biconourus (Rowland & Reddell, 1979) – Cuba
 Rowlandius candidae Teruel, Armas & Rodríguez, 2012 – Cuba
 Rowlandius casabito (Armas & Abud Antun, 1990) – Dominican Republic
 Rowlandius chinoi Armas, 2010 – Puerto Rico
 Rowlandius cousinensis (Rowland & Reddell, 1979) – Jamaica
 Rowlandius cubanacan (Armas, 1989) – Cuba
 Rowlandius cupeyalensis Armas, 2002 – Cuba
 Rowlandius decui (Dumitresco, 1977) – Cuba
 Rowlandius desecheo (Rowland & Reddell, 1979) – Puerto Rico
 Rowlandius digitiger (Dumitresco, 1977) – Cuba
 Rowlandius ducoudrayi (Armas & Abud Antun, 1990) – Dominican Republic
 Rowlandius dumitrescoae (Rowland & Reddell, 1979) – Costa Rica
 Rowlandius engombe Armas & Abud Antun, 2002 – Dominican Republic
 Rowlandius falcifemur Teruel, 2003 – Cuba
 Rowlandius florenciae Teruel, 2003 – Cuba
 Rowlandius gladiger (Dumitresco, 1977) – Cuba
 Rowlandius gracilis Teruel, 2004 – Cuba
 Rowlandius guama Teruel & Armas, 2012 – Cuba
 Rowlandius guamuhaya Teruel, Armas & Rodríguez, 2012 – Cuba
 Rowlandius guantanamero Teruel, 2004 – Cuba
 Rowlandius insignis (Hansen, 1905) – Martinique
 Rowlandius isabel Armas & Abud Antun, 2002 – Dominican Republic
 Rowlandius jarmillae Armas & Cokendolpher, 2002 – Dominican Republic
 Rowlandius labarcae (Armas, 1989) – Cuba
 Rowlandius lantiguai (Armas & Abud Antun, 1990) – Dominican Republic
 Rowlandius linsduarteae Santos, Dias, Brescovit & Santos, 2008 – Brazil
 Rowlandius littoralis Teruel, 2003 – Cuba
 Rowlandius longipalpus (Rowland & Reddell, 1979) – Dominican Republic, Haiti
 Rowlandius marianae Teruel, 2003 – Cuba
 Rowlandius melici Teruel, 2003 – Cuba
 Rowlandius mixtus Teruel, 2004 – Cuba
 Rowlandius moa Armas, 2004 – Cuba
 Rowlandius monensis (Rowland & Reddell, 1979) – Puerto Rico
 Rowlandius monticola Armas, 2002 – Cuba
 Rowlandius naranjo (Armas & Abud Antun, 1990) – Dominican Republic
 Rowlandius negreai (Dumitresco, 1973) – Cuba
 Rowlandius peckorum (Rowland & Reddell, 1979) – Jamaica
 Rowlandius potiguar Santos, Ferreira & Buzatto, 2013 – Brazil
 Rowlandius primibiconourus (Rowland & Reddell, 1979) – Jamaica
 Rowlandius ramosi Armas, 2002 – Cuba
 Rowlandius reconditus Teruel, Armas & Rodríguez, 2012 – Cuba
 Rowlandius recuerdo (Armas, 1989) – Cuba
 Rowlandius reyesi Teruel, 2000 – Cuba
 Rowlandius serrano Teruel, 2003 – Cuba
 Rowlandius siboney Armas, 2002 – Cuba
 Rowlandius steineri Armas, 2002 – Navassa Island
 Rowlandius sul Cokendolpher & Reddell, 2000 – Brazil
 Rowlandius terueli Armas, 2002 – Cuba
 Rowlandius toldo Armas, 2002 – Cuba
 Rowlandius tomasi Armas, 2007 – Cuba
 Rowlandius ubajara Santos, Ferreira & Buzatto, 2013 – Brazil
 Rowlandius vinai Teruel, 2003 – Cuba
 Rowlandius viquezi Armas, 2009 – Costa Rica
 Rowlandius virginiae Armas & Abud Antun, 2002 – Dominican Republic
 Rowlandius viridis (Rowland & Reddell, 1979) – Jamaica
†Rowlandius velteni (Krüger & Dunlop, 2010) – Dominican Republic (Miocene Amber)

References 

Schizomida genera